Donald Walter Steinmetz (September 19, 1924August 31, 2013) was an American lawyer and judge.  He served as a justice of the Wisconsin Supreme Court for 19 years, and before that was a trial judge in Milwaukee County for 14 years.

Background
Born in Milwaukee, Wisconsin, Steinmetz served in the United States Army Air Forces during World War II. Steinmetz then graduated from the University of Wisconsin–Madison and received his law degree from the University of Wisconsin Law School. Steinmetz was a claims attorney before his service in government.  Between 1958 and 1966, he worked as an assistant Milwaukee city attorney, an assistant district attorney in Milwaukee County, and an assistant Wisconsin Attorney General. In 1964, he was the preferred candidate of Democratic leaders, including Governor John W. Reynolds, Jr., to replace deceased Milwaukee County District Attorney William McCauley, but the post went to Hugh O'Connell. He was a Wisconsin county judge and later a Wisconsin Circuit Court judge for Milwaukee County after the county courts were combined into the circuit courts. He was also a teacher at the Wisconsin Judicial College.  He was elected to the Wisconsin Supreme Court in 1980 and re-elected in 1990.

He died on August 31, 2013, in Milwaukee.

Notes

Justices of the Wisconsin Supreme Court
Wisconsin state court judges
University of Wisconsin–Madison alumni
University of Wisconsin Law School alumni
Politicians from Milwaukee
United States Army Air Forces soldiers
Military personnel from Milwaukee
1924 births
2013 deaths
Lawyers from Milwaukee
20th-century American judges
20th-century American lawyers